Waltz of the Stork is a semi-autobiographical play written and originally performed by Melvin Van Peebles. It also featured his son Mario Van Peebles. The play originally ran for four months in 1982. It ran from January 5, 1982 to May 23, 1982.

The song "The Apple Stretching", featured in this play, was later covered by Grace Jones, and released as a single. In 2008, a film based on the play, Confessionsofa Ex-Doofus-ItchyFooted Mutha, was released, directed by Van Peebles.

Cast/Crew
Melvin Van Peebles - Edward Aloysius Younger
Bob Carten - Stillman
C.J.Critt - Phantoms, etc
 Mario Van Peebles - Phantoms, etc

Songs
 There
 And I Love You
 The Apple Stretching
 Tender Understanding (written by Teddy Hayes)
 The Apple Stretching
 My Love Belongs To You
 Weddings And Funerals (written by Mark Barkan)
 On 115
 Play It As It Lays
 Shoulders To Lean On

References

American plays